The brothers Johann and Wendelin of Speyer (also known as de Speier and by their Italian names of Giovanni and Vindelino da Spira) were German printers in Venice from 1468 to 1477. 

They were among the first of those who came to Italy from Mainz, after 1462, to introduce printing. Knowledge of their lives is scanty. They came originally from Speyer. Early in 1460-61 Johann appears in Mainz as a goldsmith. In 1468, with his wife, children, and brother Wendelin, he set out for Italy, settling in Venice.

First books 
The Venetian Senate extended a cordial welcome to Johann, and granted him a monopoly of printing for five years. His first book, Cicero's Epistolae ad familiares, appeared in 1469. Together they issued seven works. Before Johann died, four great works had been issued: two editions of Cicero; the editio princeps of Pliny the Elder's Naturalis Historia (1469); and the second printed edition of Livy's Ab Urbe condita libri (1470). Within seven months eight hundred volumes were printed. During the printing of Augustine's De civitate Dei (1470) Johann died, and Wendelin completed it, assuming control of the business and carried it on until 1477. About 1472 he associated with him the German printer, Johann von Köln.

Series 
From 1470 to 1477 Wendelin issued over seventy major works (Italian and Roman classics, Fathers of the Church, jurists, etc.). Johann printed in an antique type modelled after the best Italian manuscript writing, beautiful, and carefully cut. It is superior to the later antique type, which deteriorated through desire to save space, and it is almost equal to the beautiful type of Jenson. Johann's clear type and his entire technical execution are surprisingly perfect.

Type faces 
In addition to this first type, Wendelin used five newly cut types of exquisite workmanship, among them three slender Gothic models, probably reduced to save space. His work showed the same correctness of text, beauty of printing, and evenness that had characterized Johann's. The latter was the first printer to number the leaves with Arabic numerals, and was also the first who used the colon and interrogation point. In Wendelin's books appeared for the first time the so-called catch-words (Kustoden), that is to say he printed on the lower margin of each page the first word of the page following.

The Speyer brothers are sometimes credited as the originators of the Roman type of character of movable type, other contenders being Pannartz and Sweynheim and Nicholas Jenson.

References 

 
 Denis, Suffragium pro J. de Spira (Vienna, 1794)
 Brown, Venetian Printing Press (London, 1891)
 Ongania, Art de l'imprimerie a Venise (Venice, 1895-6)
 Hartwig et al., Festschrift zum 500 jahr. Geburstage von Johann Gutenberg (Mainz, 1900), 342.
 Example of Wendelin of Speyer printing

German printers
Printers of incunabula